The ABC Board is the body responsible for the operations of the Australian Broadcasting Corporation. , Ita Buttrose  is chair; David Anderson the managing director appointed by the board; Jane Connors is a staff-elected member. The chair and other directors are chosen by the Australian Government.

Composition, structure and responsibilities
The ABC Board is a board of directors that is responsible for the operations of the Australian Broadcasting Corporation. It is made up of five to seven directors chosen by the Australian government, and a managing director who is appointed by the board itself. At various times, ABC staff have been granted rights to elect a nominee for appointment to the board; and as of April 2013 staff elected a nominee-director. The duties of the board, as set out in the Australian Broadcasting Corporation Act 1983, commonly called the ABC Act, (section 8) include duties "to ensure that the functions of the Corporation are performed efficiently and with the maximum benefit to the people of Australia; to maintain the independence and integrity of the Corporation; and to ensure that the gathering and presentation by the Corporation of news and information is accurate and impartial according to the recognized standards of objective journalism".

The Governor-General, on the recommendation of the Federal Government, appoints members, as specified in the ABC Act. The ABC Act specifies that Directors must be experienced in broadcasting, communications or management, or have expertise in financial or technical matters, or have cultural or other interests relevant to the provision of broadcasting services. Each director serves a term of five years, with eligibility for reappointment at the end of this term.

Directors are expected to follow the ABC Board Protocol, which stipulates responsibilities, expectations, rights, and benefits.

The board maintains an Advisory Council, which advises it on matters concerning the Corporation's programming. The Council is made up of twelve members, broadly representative of the Australian community, which serve staggered four-year terms. Vacancies are advertised in September–October each year. The Advisory Council's current Chairman is Dr Jane Munro, Head of International House at the University of Melbourne.

Process of appointment
The Minister for Communications nominates candidates to the Governor-General for appointment to the ABC Board; based on a shortlist prepared by an independent nomination panel. , members of the panel were former Treasury Secretary and Westpac Chairman, Ted Evans AC (Chairman); company director and lawyer, Dr Sally Pitkin; public relations media director and former broadcaster, Anne Fulwood; and former Australian Public Service Commissioner and departmental secretary, Helen Williams.

Appointments to the board made by successive governments have often resulted in criticism of the appointees' political affiliation, background, and relative merit. From 2003 the Howard government also made several controversial appointments to the ABC Board, including Albrechtsen, a prominent critic, Ron Brunton, and Keith Windschuttle.

During their 2007 federal election campaign, Labor announced plans to introduce a new system, similar to that of the BBC, for appointing members to the board. Under this new system, now in place, ABC candidates are considered by a panel established "at arm's length" from the Communications Minister. If the Minister chose someone not on the panel's shortlist, the Minister would be required to justify their selection to Australian Parliament. The Chairman of the ABC is nominated by the Prime Minister and endorsed by the Leader of the Opposition.

Current board members

 board members are:

Notable people

Chairs

Notable directors

Managers

Criticism
Past appointments have been associated directly with political parties—five of fourteen appointed chairmen have been accused of political affiliation or friendship, including Richard Downing and Ken Myer (both of whom publicly endorsed the Australian Labor Party at the 1972 election), as well as Sir Henry Bland. David Hill was close to Neville Wran, while Donald McDonald was considered to be a close friend of John Howard.

In the past, appointments of commissioners and directors also drew criticism. In the 1932, a majority of the commissioners were publicly conservative. This continued to 1942, when the Curtin and Chifley administrations appointed a more 'politically balanced' commission.

Once elected to power, Labor prime minister Whitlam replaced the entire board—appointed by Liberal governments over the previous 23 years—with supporters of the Labor Party. His successor, Malcolm Fraser, attempted unsuccessfully to take similar action by replacing the board with politically conservative commissioners in 1976, but was only able to make new appointments by adding two extra director positions onto the board.

In 1983, Minister John Button referred proposed board appointments to an all-party committee for the first time. This practice was discontinued before the end of Paul Keating's government. Alan Ramsey, in a 1996 article for The Sydney Morning Herald noted that:

A 2006 restructure of the ABC board, undertaken by the Howard government, abolished the position of staff elected director. The elected director was previously nominated and elected by employees of the ABC. Nominees for this director office were to have been employed at least 24 hours a week by the ABC and the term of office was two years with eligibility for re-election to a second term. An elected director was not eligible for a third term of office. Broadcaster Ramona Koval had occupied the position for the previous four years prior to its abolition amid ongoing intense controversy. This drew criticism from the Labor Party, Australian Greens, and the Democrats, who saw it as a 'revenge measure' taken against the Corporation.

In July 2007, Labor announced plans to make the system of appointments to the board independent of the Minister for Communications; and also reinstate the staff election of a nominee director. Initial members of the independent panel were Gonski, Smith, Allan Fels and Leneen Forde.

In September 2018, there was criticism raised by Labor's Shadow Communications Minister Michelle Rowland about ABC's "independence and integrity of Australia's most trusted news organisation risk having been compromised" following discussions within the ABC board about an email instruction from Justin Milne to Michelle Guthrie in May 2018 to sack senior presenter Emma Alberici, on the basis that what was reported by Alberici did not agree with the government.

On 24 September 2018, Justin Milne announced to ABC staff that Managing Director Michelle Guthrie was sacked following discussions with the ABC executive and directors. Milne then announced his resignation on 27 September.  Communications Minister Mitch Fifield has directly appointed a majority of the current members of the board, some of whom were rejected by the nomination panel.

See also
History of the Australian Broadcasting Corporation

References

Australian Broadcasting Corporation